Teitur Lassen (4 January 1977) is a Faroese musician, composer, singer-songwriter and producer. He is a winner of multiple Danish Music Awards and has toured globally since his debut release, Poetry & Aeroplanes, in 2003.

Teitur was born in Hoyvík. Since 2001 he has dedicated himself to playing and writing music in English full-time, and has released six studio albums as a solo artist. He has additionally produced, written for, or worked with multiple international artists including Seal, Corinne Bailey Rae, Netherlands Wind Ensemble, Emilie Simon, International Contemporary Ensemble (ICE), Holland Baroque Society, Nolwenn Leroy, Nico Muhly, and Ane Brun. His songs have appeared on major motion picture soundtracks and numerous compilations.

Studio albums

Poetry and Aeroplanes 
After finding both a publishing deal with Windswept Pacific and a record contract with Universal Records in the United States, the Faroe Islands awarded him its 2004 "Businessman of the Year" award. His first major album, Poetry & Aeroplanes, released in 2003, was recorded in Los Angeles and Spain and featured a number of prominent studio musicians such as Pino Palladino, Matt Chamberlain and the production of Rupert Hine.

Within months of its debut, the record found a following among many of popular music's inner circle. Extensive touring in the US and Canada and rave reviews and industry/musician buzz led to opening slots on tours with Suzanne Vega, Glen Phillips, Rufus Wainwright, Aimee Mann, and John Mayer. John Mayer later described the album in his Esquire magazine article: "it may be one of the best albums to come around in the last five years...Music like this is jet fuel on the fire of a broken heart. Even if you think the flame has died, there's at least one lyric that'll hit that last hot spot, and then you'll find yourself as fucked as you were the day you lied and said you never wanted to see her again. Enjoy."

Teitur was featured on MTV's You Hear it First program. While not picked up by mainstream radio, several of the songs on Poetry & Aeroplanes found airplay on major television and motion picture soundtracks, most recently in the 2006 films Aquamarine and My Super Ex-Girlfriend. Teitur continued to tour extensively in over 20 countries, building a firm following and respect amongst media and the musician community, despite the lack of commercial marketing by Universal Records.

Stay Under the Stars 
On 20 April 2006, Teitur's management issued a statement that he had dropped Universal as his record label following months of legal problems and creative differences, and from then on his records would be released on Arlo and Betty Recordings, a new label, run by his manager, and named after his two vintage Gibson guitars.

His second studio record Stay Under the Stars, produced by Martin Terefe (Jason Mraz, Ron Sexsmith, KT Tunstall, Train), was released in May 2006 in Scandinavia on Arlo and Betty, licensed to the indie label Playground Music. After spending several months in the Danish Top-40, the album was released in the U.S. and Canada on 5 September 2006 on the newly formed Equator Records, and on iTunes on 8 September 2006 and Edel Records in Germany, Austria and Switzerland.

The songs circle around the question asked in The Beatles' "Eleanor Rigby" lyric, "All the lonely people, where do they all come from?" and are written in first person about characters such as hitchhikers, burglars, night shift workers, star gazers and a carousel attendant. Also included is a re-arrangement of the Jerry Lee Lewis classic "Great Balls of Fire."

Káta Hornið 
In 2007, Teitur released an album performed entirely in his native Faroese language under the title Káta Hornið. It was initially released in the Faroe Islands and Iceland, and Teitur toured throughout the Faroe Islands in its support. The album was recorded in a summer vacation house in Tisvildeleje, Denmark, in January 2007 and mixed in Santa Barbara, California, later in the year.

The Singer 
In October 2007, Teitur started recording a new album, The Singer. The recording studio was set up in the barn of the famous house "Fridhem" on the island of Gotland, former home and dying place of world-renowned director Ingmar Bergman. The album was produced by Teitur and recorded and engineered by his long-time live sound engineer Jonas Bloch Danielsen, with arranger collaborator Tróndur Bogason. The album was released in Scandinavia on 11 February 2008, and a few months later in the rest of world. In 2009, he was awarded "Danish singer/songwriter Album of the Year" for The Singer at the Danish Music Awards 2009 and Albums of the Week in the UK's Guardian and Independent.

Let the Dog Drive Home 
Teitur recorded his next album, Let the Dog Drive Home, in early 2010 in Copenhagen, with some of his regular musicians and collaborators, arranger Tróndur Bogason, drummer Derek Murphy (Atlanta, Georgia), bass player Mikael Blak (Faroe Islands), and Nikolaj Torp Larsen (London), and a host of guest musicians, and backing singers. Teitur once again produced the album, which was recorded and engineered by his regular cohort Jonas Bloch Danielsen and mixed by George Tandero (Norway) who also recorded and mixed Stay Under the Stars. The song title that spawned the album title is a metaphor for relaxing and letting things just happen. The artwork for the album, is based on a series of drawings by Teitur of a dog character, reflecting some of the lyrics in the album; the graphic design being handled, as on all his albums, by London-based Bob McKie with direction by Christian Ulf-Hansen.

The album was released in October 2010 in Scandinavia, reaching the top 10 in Denmark, preceded by the single "You Never Leave L.A." and in Germany, Austria, Switzerland, France, Benelux and Italy, also charting in the Netherlands; the single's animated video based on the dog character of the album artwork, directed by Alex Lee, took nearly six months to make. The first single in the UK and Ireland was the track "Betty Hedges", and the album was released on 11 April 2011 there, to great reviews, including "Album of the Week" in The Independent.

Story Music 
In 2013, Teitur released his fifth studio album in English. The album written, produced and arranged by Teitur is the first one recorded on the Faroe Islands, and it features 78 local musicians from the age of 7 to 83. The recording took place in Studio Bloch, the first professional recording studio on the Faroes, built by long-time collaborator Jonas Bloch Danielsen, who also engineered and recorded the album. The style is described as world music, and it features many references to Faroese culture and traditions such as ring dance, folk music, monotony and nature. The song "It's Not Funny Anymore" was arranged for orchestra by Van Dyke Parks and recorded in the Eindhoven Concertgebouw by Reyn Ouwehand, performed by members of the Holland Baroque Society and additional musicians. The first single "Rock and Roll Band" was playlisted on 120 American radio stations. The album was awarded Artistic Achievement of the Year on the Faroe Islands. An interactive film about the album recordings is in production.

I Want To Be Kind 
In 2018, Teitur released his album I Want To Be Kind, recorded and mixed in Reservoir Studios in New York, USA. The album was produced by well known musician/producer Thomas Bartlett (aka Doveman), with additional production by Teitur, and mixed by Patrick Dillett. Teitur sang all the vocals and Teitur and Thomas played most of the instruments on the album, with some additional bass clarinet by Doug Wieselman.

Cazador de Ostras
Released in September 2021, the Cazador de Ostras album, produced by Teitur was recorded in late 2019 in Mawi Road Studios in Buenos Aires, Argentina, with local guest musicians playing on the record with Teitur and Mariana Paraway features as guest vocalist with Teitur on the track "Broken Stars". The album was later edited in his studio in the Faroes in 2020 and then mixed by Dave Izumi Lynch at Echo Zoo in Eastbourne, UK. Half the album is in English and half in Faroese.

Other works 
In 2005, Teitur sang the track "Syner" on the 2005 "Andersen's Drømme" album, produced and compiled by Danish producer Nikolaj Nørlund. Norlund went on to produce Teitur's version of "Happy Xmas (War Is Over)" for the Danish Christmas album, Fra Danske Hjerter (translated as From Danish Hearts) in 2010.

In 2006 Grammy winner Corinne Bailey Rae released a song she co-wrote with Teitur "Choux Pastry Heart" on her debut album which sold 4 million copies worldwide and debuted at number one in the British charts.

In 2008 Teitur collaborated with composer Nico Muhly for the piece Confessions for the Holland Baroque Society. Confessions is a 14-piece song cycle for baroque instruments and voice. The music accompanies a series of mundane internet videos. Confessions was performed four times in 2008 and an additional nine shows around Holland in 2010 including at the famous Concertgebouw in Amsterdam. The album was released by Nonesuch Records in 2016.

Teitur produced and arranged the album "Le Cheshire Cat et Moi" in 2009 for French superstar Nolwenn Leroy, in addition to co-writing five of the songs.

In 2010, the legendary Italian singer Mina recorded Teitur's song "You Get Me" as a duet with Seal, which was the first single from her album Caramella, which went top 3 in Italy. Seal went on to record the song again, with David Foster producing, for Seal's album "Commitment", which charted in 12 countries, also recording it as a duet with Concha Buika (Spain), TinkaBelle (Switzerland) and Anna Eriksson (Finland).

In 2011, Teitur wrote a seven-piece song cycle for choir and orchestra called "Weekdays", which was performed in late 2011 by the Danish National Symphony Orchestra and the DR Girls choir in Copenhagen.

In 2012, Teitur performed live across the Netherlands with the Netherlands Wind Ensemble, while a film was shown which he commissioned and composed the score to, directed by Thomas Koba, under the title "Everyday Song", with additional music composed for the live show by Trondur Bogason. They also performed as part of the Copenhagen International Documentary Festival (CPH:DOX). During 2012, Teitur composed the music for the yet to be released indie film The Load directed by Kristian Sonderby.

In 2013, he wrote music to the sonnet requiem "Sommerfugledalen" by Inger Christensen for full choir, piano and strings. The 30-minute piece was premiered in Holstebro with 100 young choristers in celebration of the 75th birthday of the Holstebro Gymnasium og HF, where Teitur was a student. The same year, Teitur appeared as a singer with the Danish National Symphony Orchestra in a new Danish requiem by composer John Frandsen with words by Simon Grotian. Teitur sang six songs solo with organ. The requiem premiered in Koncerthuset in April 2013.

In 2015, Teitur wrote "Romeo Answers (Songs from Juliet Letters)" for Messer Quartet. The piece for voice, string quartet and computer voices is 23 songs based on Juliet Letters, letters administered by Juliet Club (Club di Giulietta) that writers send to Shakespeare's Juliet in Verona. The concept is influenced by Juliet Letters an album by Elvis Costello and Brodsky Quartet released in 1993. The piece was premiered with electric strings in Engelsholm castle, Denmark in August, 2015.

In 2017, eight of Teitur's songs were integrated in the hymnal of Church of Denmark, Kirkesangbogen.

In 2017, the album Ich bin das Chaos was released by Judith Holofernes. Teitur was the co-writer of nine songs and co-produced and arranged the album as well as playing guitar, piano and synths. The album debuted at no. 13 in the German chart.

In 2018, Teitur released Running Music together with Mads Bjørn which is electronic music for running, fitness and movement. The album went to no. 1 on Danish Electronica charts on iTunes.

In 2019, Teitur appeared in the Danish TV series Toppen af Poppen, performing songs by six other well known artists, who also performed songs originally recorded by Teitur. In September 2019 the success of the show fueled Teitur's 2003 album Poetry & Aeroplanes going to no. 1 on the Danish iTunes charts, with three other of his releases in the top 20.

In 2020, Teitur released a four track EP, Modern Era, with visuals based on photos by Simon Harsent

Discography

Studio albums

Music 
Ringtones released by The LightsOut Trio with Elina Albach (2020)
Chinese Whispers (Hviskeleg) for guitar quartet (2017) Released by The Danish Guitar Quartet (2020)
Romeo Answers (Songs from Juliet Letters) for voice, string quartet and computer voices (2015) 
The Lapidary Song for viola, cello, drone quartet and pre-recorded material (2015)
Desert Island Music for clarinet in Bb and piano (2015)
Y Arpeggios for keyboard or percussion (2015)
Sommerfugledalen for full choir, strings and piano (2013)
Five Year-old Girl Skips Down the Street and Finds Ring for harp and vibraphone (2013)
Everyday Song for wind ensemble, percussion, voice and moving pictures (2012)
La Mattina (with Bent Sørensen) for strings, piano and voice (2012)
The Load for flute, alto flute, trumpet, piano and accordion (2011)
Weekdays for full choir, strings, percussion, piano and harp (2011)
Confessions (with Nico Muhly) for recorder, strings, lute, harpsichord and voice (2008)
Plagues for recorder, organ, piano, guitar and electronics (2008)

EPs 
Four Songs (2012)
Four Songs and B Sides (2012) (8 track Vinyl only version)
Monogram Sessions (2013) (3 songs for Radio24syv vinyl only release)
Y Arpeggios for piano (2017)
Modern Era (2020) (4 track online only release)

Compilations 
All My Mistakes (2009)

Soundtrack appearances 
Aquamarine (film)#Original soundtrack|Aquamarine Motion Picture Soundtrack (2006)
My Super Ex-Girlfriend (film)#Original soundtrack|My Super Ex-Girlfriend Motion Picture Soundtrack (2006)
Andersens Drømme (H.C Andersen's Dreams) (2007)
Songs for Tibet: The Art of Peace (Dalai Lama compilation album) (2008)

DVD releases 
A Night At The Opera (2010)
Den 11. time (The eleventh Hour, Danish talkshow, Season 3) (2008)

Collaborations 
"Choux Pastry Heart", co-writer with Corinne Bailey Rae on the album Corinne Bailey Rae
"I Won't Let You Lie to Yourself", co-writer with Corinne Bailey Rae and Marc Nelkin; also on the album Corinne Bailey Rae (Deluxe version)
"Cloud Gazing", co-writer with Gordie Sampson on the album Sunburn
"All My Mistakes", appearance with Tarira on Songs For Tibet, 2009
"Rubber & Soul", appearance with Ane Brun on the album Duets
"Confessions Songcycle", co-writer and appearance with Nico Muhly for the 'Holland Baroque Society', first performed at the CrossLinx Festival in Holland in March 2008.
"Le Cheshire cat & moi", co-writer, producer and arranger of the album with Nolwenn Leroy, 2009
"Rocket to the Moon", co-writer with Émilie Simon on the album The Big Machine, 2009
"Let's Go Dancing", appearance with Tina Dico on the album Welcome Back Colour, 2010
"I Can't Love You Anymore", co-writer with Marit Larsen on the album Spark, 2011
"Alting var smukkere dengang", string arranger for Mouritz/Hørslev on the album Allermindst dig selv, 2013
"Swimmer", appearance with Jakob Bro for remixes of album December Song, 2013
"Requiem", with Danish National Symphony Orchestra singer of six songs in requiem by John Frandsen with words by Simon Grotian, 2013
"Ich bin das Chaos", co-writer, co-producer and arranger with Judith Holofernes
"The Future That Cannot Be Known" (original and 'Quarantine Edition') single collaboration with UNSECRET. Credited to UNSECRET X Teitur, 2020.
"Seasick", guest duet vocal on song by Dicte, 2021
 Ich War so gern gut" by Judith Holofernes. Co-written by Teitur. Also used in German Film "Es ist nur eine phase hase", directed by Florian Gallenberger, 2021.
"Heaven" single by Swan Lee, Co-writer and exec producer, September 2022
"Got Away With Murder", guest vocal with Danish band Swan Lee. Also co-writer and exec producer. November 2022.

Personal life 
Teitur has been married to Ingilín Didriksen Strøm, member of the Løgting, since 2016. They have one son.

References

External links

 Teitur (official site)
 Sangtekstir.com

1977 births
Living people
Faroese guitarists
Faroese male singers
Faroese composers
Faroese singer-songwriters
Universal Records artists
21st-century Danish male  singers
21st-century guitarists